The men's 3000 metres steeplechase event at the 2016 African Championships in Athletics was held on 22 June in Kings Park Stadium.

Results

References

2016 African Championships in Athletics
Steeplechase at the African Championships in Athletics